Of Horses and Men is a 2013 Icelandic drama film written and directed by Benedikt Erlingsson and produced by fellow director Friðrik Þór Friðriksson.

The film was selected as the Icelandic entry for the Best Foreign Language Film at the 86th Academy Awards, but it was not nominated. The film won the 2014 Nordic Council Film Prize. In 2014, it won the audience award at the Tromsø International Film Festival in Norway.

Plot
In a remote Icelandic valley, there is not much to do other than observe the horses, the neighbors, and the neighbors' horses with binoculars. Undisturbed, the stallions and mares do what nobody else in the valley dares to even talk about: love. However, there is still a feeling of love among some of the valley dwellers. Kolbeinn (Ingvar Eggert Sigurðsson) and Solveig's (Charlotte Bøving) attempts at love are the subject of much interest for the valley dwellers.

Meanwhile, Vernhardur (Steinn Ármann Magnússon), who has a weakness for liquor, makes a name for himself on a Russian fishing vessel with the sailor Gengis (Kash Erden Baater). There is often disagreement about the riding routes between Grimur (Kjartan Ragnarsson) and Egill (Helgi Björnsson); Grimur generally prefers the classic routes on horseback, whereas Egill prefers riding through rough terrain on his tractor. Jóhanna (Sigríður María Egilsdóttir), on the other hand, has nothing to say concerning her mare Raudka. One day, she encounters an injured old man. The religious Juan Camillo (himself) is seeking God on a high spiritual level.

Above all, all the people in the valley share a love of their horses, and eventually come to understand one another.

Cast
 Helgi Björnsson
 Charlotte Bøving
 Sigríður María Egilsdóttir
 Maria Ellingsen
 Juan Camillo Roman Estrada
 Halldóra Geirharðsdóttir
 Erlingur Gíslason
 Kristbjörg Kjeld
 Steinn Ármann Magnússon
 Kjartan Ragnarsson
 Atli Rafn Sigurðsson
 Ingvar Eggert Sigurðsson

Reception
The film holds an approval rating of 100% on Rotten Tomatoes based on 31 reviews, with an average rating of 7.60 out of 10. The site's critics' consensus reads: "Well-crafted and resoundingly original, Of Horses and Men is as intelligent, inscrutable, and breathtakingly lovely as its titular equines."

Robbie Collin described Of Horses and Men as a "collection of six-or-so interlocking fables about a group of rural Icelanders’ relationships with their horses and each other, and which run the gamut from stony-black comedies of sex and death to chilly meditations on the blind cruelty of fate."  He gave it four stars out of five and called it "something truly and seductively strange" and "tenderly attuned to the weather and landscape, both of which are captured in you-could-almost-be-there vividness, and underscored by a heady swirl of choral works and primal drumming."

See also

 List of films with a 100% rating on Rotten Tomatoes
 List of submissions to the 86th Academy Awards for Best Foreign Language Film
 List of Icelandic submissions for the Academy Award for Best Foreign Language Film

References

External links
  (via Internet Archive Wayback Machine)
 
 

2013 films
2013 comedy films
2013 drama films
2013 romantic comedy-drama films
Icelandic romantic comedy-drama films
Films about horses
2010s Icelandic-language films
Films directed by Benedikt Erlingsson